Yoroa clypeoglandularis is a species of comb-footed spider in the family Theridiidae. It is found in New Guinea.

References

Theridiidae
Spiders described in 1984
Arthropods of New Guinea